Codville Lagoon Marine Provincial Park is a provincial park in British Columbia, Canada, located on the southwest end of King Island.  The park was created in 1965 because it is a significant site to the Heiltsuk People.  This park, which is approximately 755 ha. in area, has an unmaintained trail to Sagar Lake which has a red sand beach.  Created in 1992, it was expanded in 1995 by the incorporation of the former Sugar Lake Provincial Park.

References

External links
BC Parks page for Codville Lagoon
A Kayaking trip visits Codville Lagoon

Provincial parks of British Columbia
Central Coast of British Columbia
Heiltsuk
1965 establishments in British Columbia
Protected areas established in 1965
Marine parks of Canada